Carlos Antoine Emmons (born September 3, 1973) is a former American football linebacker in the National Football League.  Emmons is President/CEO of Emmons, LLC. and owned restaurants/bars called Wet Willie's and B51 in Atlanta, GA.

Biography
Emmons started playing football in seventh grade as an offensive lineman before moving to wide receiver in eighth grade. He attended Greenwood High School and played defensive back and linebacker. After high school, he played college football at Arkansas State University, where he was a four-year starter and received his BS in Business Management in December 1995. He earned second-team All-Big West Conference honors following his senior season, when he had 63 tackles, including four sacks.

Emmons was drafted in the seventh round of the 1996 NFL Draft by the Pittsburgh Steelers and played for the Steelers until 1999. In 2000, he began playing with the Philadelphia Eagles and was named team Defensive MVP in his final year. He signed as a free agent by the New York Giants in March 2004 and was released by them on February 12, 2007, after having career-ending back surgery.

References

External links
 

1973 births
Living people
American football linebackers
Arkansas State Red Wolves football players
New York Giants players
Philadelphia Eagles players
Pittsburgh Steelers players
People from Greenwood, Mississippi
Players of American football from Mississippi
African-American players of American football
21st-century African-American sportspeople
20th-century African-American sportspeople
Ed Block Courage Award recipients